Egg foo young (also spelled egg fooyung, egg foo yong, egg foo yung, or egg fu yung) is an omelette dish found in Chinese Indonesian, British Chinese, and Chinese American cuisine.
The name comes from the Cantonese language. Egg foo young is derived from fu yung egg slices, a mainland Chinese recipe from Guangdong.

Preparation 
The dish originates in the southern Chinese coastal province of Guangdong, which was known as Canton. Most versions which are found today are a Cantonese hybrid both in the United States and Asia.

Literally meaning "Hibiscus egg", this dish is prepared with beaten eggs and most often made with various vegetables such as bean sprouts, bamboo shoots, sliced cabbage, spring onions, mushrooms, and water chestnuts. When meat is used as an ingredient, a choice of roast pork, shrimp, chicken, beef, or lobster may be offered.

In Chinese Indonesian cuisine, it is known as fu yung hai (literally "Hibiscus crab"), sometimes spelled pu yung hai. The omelette is usually made from the mixture of vegetables such as carrots, bean sprouts, and cabbages, mixed with meats such as crab meat, shrimp, or minced chicken. The dish is often served in sweet and sour sauce with peas.

In Western countries, the dish usually appears as a well-folded omelette with the non-egg ingredients embedded in the egg mixture. In America, it may be covered in or served with sauce or gravy. Chinese chefs in the United States, at least as early as the 1930s, created a pancake filled with eggs, vegetables, and meat or seafood. In a U.S. regional variation, many American-Chinese restaurants in St. Louis, Missouri, serve what is called a St. Paul sandwich, which is an egg foo young patty served with mayonnaise, dill pickle, and sometimes lettuce and tomato between two slices of white bread.

In the Netherlands, which has a local variation on the Chinese Indonesian cuisine, it is known as Foe yong hai, and is usually served with a sweet tomato sauce.
Strictly, according to hai in the name, it should contain crab, but it is often served without this ingredient.

Comparison 
The Vietnamese dish chả trứng hấp is similar to egg foo young.

In Japanese Chinese cuisine, the dish kani-tama (かに玉 or 蟹玉) is similar, using crab meat instead of ham or other meats. Egg foo yung or kani-tama on plain rice draped with thick savory sauce is called Tenshin-han (天津飯, Tianjin rice), even though no such dish is known in the actual Chinese city of Tianjin.

Certain incarnations of the Korean-Chinese dish jjajang bokkeumbap (짜장 볶음밥) are similar; in essence the dish consists of jjajang (a dark brown-black bean and meat sauce) and fried rice, with an optional fried egg or egg-foo-young-like omelet atop the rice.

In Malay cuisine, it is similar to telur bungkus, which literally means "wrapped egg" (the wrap usually contains chicken or beef, onions, mushrooms, vegetables, and gravy, wrapped inside the egg).

In Chinese Thai cuisine, this dish is called Khai Chiao Yat Sai, which literally means "stuffed fried egg". The common recipe uses minced pork and shredded spring onion.

See also 

 Chinese steamed eggs
 Okonomiyaki
 List of egg dishes
 List of onion dishes
 List of vegetable dishes

References

American Chinese cuisine
Australian Chinese cuisine
Canadian Chinese cuisine
New Zealand Chinese cuisine
Cantonese cuisine
Polynesian Chinese cuisine
Egg dishes
Indonesian Chinese cuisine
Omelettes